Murilo Milani Rua (born May 22, 1980), also known as Ninja, is a Brazilian retired mixed martial artist. He is the older brother of former UFC Light Heavyweight Champion Mauricio Rua. He was the inaugural EliteXC Middleweight Champion and also competed in Pride Fighting Championships.

Mixed martial arts career

Rua started his career at Chute Boxe Academy in Curitiba, Brazil, a Muay Thai training group which has produced champions like Wanderlei Silva. Ninja's first foray into MMA was with Brazilian-based Meca World Vale Tudo, where he amassed an impressive 5–0–1 record before signing with Pride Fighting Championships.

Ninja made his PRIDE debut against Daijiro Matsui in September 2001, which he won via referee stoppage after repeated kicks and stomps. After losing a close decision to Dan Henderson, Rua went on to defeat Alex Andrade, and Alexander Otsuka. Rua was scheduled to fight for the Meca Middleweight (205 lb) title vs Jorge Navalhada, but was injured, and could not fight for the title. After returning from injury, he defeated Mario Sperry, and this fueled beginning of the long lasting rivalry between Chute Boxe and Brazilian Top Team. Rua lost to Ricardo Arona in a close battle of attrition, and Sergei Kharitonov in the Pride Total Elimination 2004, where he fought as a heavyweight, suffering a brutal knockout loss.

At Pride 29, Rua faced Quinton Jackson. Rua lost the fight by split decision which was controversial. Jackson was noticeably confused with the result and attempted to offer the winner's trophy to Rua following the decision. Commentators such as Mauro Ranallo and Bas Rutten, who were present at the bout, also have stated that they thought Rua had won the fight.

Rua fought three more times in Pride, defeating newcomer Murad Chunkaiev before dropping a lacklustre decision against top ranked Paulo Filho. Nevertheless, Rua was selected as part of the Pride welterweight (185 pound) Grand Prix. In the opening bracket, however, he was knocked out by Denis Kang. Rua then left Pride for a tenure with British MMA promotion Cage Rage in order to strengthen the tie between the two promotions. His first bout, against English UFC veteran Mark Weir, resulted in a victory by submission after a rough and tumble affair. He also defeated Alex Reid via doctor stoppage before the newly created EliteXC organization purchased Cage Rage, therefore he fought for the vacant Elite XC middleweight at Strikeforce: Shamrock vs. Baroni against Greg Jackson trained Joey Villasenor and recorded a second-round TKO, stopping Villasenor with strikes. After three months as the champion, his first title defense came to ICON sport middleweight champion Robbie Lawler. Despite narrowly winning the first two rounds, an exhausted Ninja was defeated via a third-round TKO at EliteXC: Uprising. He rebounded with a victory over Muay Thai fighter and Cage Rage contender Xavier Foupa-Pokam at Cage Rage 24: Feel the pain.

On December 18, 2007, Sherdog.com reported that both Rua and his brother Mauricio had left the Chute Boxe camp with plans to open up their own facility in Massachusetts. The Ruas' new camp was named Universidade da luta, which translates to "University of Fighting", and instead was opened in the Ruas' hometown of Curitiba, Brazil.

Rua was initially scheduled to fight Phil Baroni on the May 31, 2008, EliteXC card, however, he suffered a minor foot injury which led him to fight on the June 14 card instead, where he recorded a dominant KO victory over undefeated Tony Bonello. On October 4, 2008, Rua was defeated by Benji Radach on a live CBS broadcast. Radach finished the fight with punches to Rua's head after a failed flying knee sent him sprawling on his back.

Rua made his Dream debut at Dream 8 against Riki Fukuda on April 5, 2009. His original opponent was supposed to be Dong Sik Yoon but Dong was injured and Riki was found as a late replacement. Rua went on to lose against Riki by unanimous decision. After winning both of his latest bouts at Bitetti Combat MMA 4 and Bitetti Combat MMA 5 in the Light heavyweight division, Rua hinted that he will continue fighting at 205 lb.

Rua was supposed to fight Falaniko Vitale at Shine Fights 3 on May 15, 2010. The middleweight bout between Falaniko Vitale and Rua, previously announced for Shine Fights Worlds Collide: Mayorga vs. Thomas, was scrapped due to an injury sustained by Vitale.

Rua was planning to participate in Dream 14, though that event being rescheduled led to other plans.

Rua beat Jeremy May on July 18, 2010 at Impact Fighting Championships by submission via guillotine choke.

Boughton missed weight by 5.5 lbs.

"Ninja" fought Tom Watson for the BAMMA Middleweight Title on May 21, 2011. The fight proved to be a one sided affair, with Rua being rocked several times throughout the fight, as well as being visibly hurt with leg kicks. The end came at 2:06 of the third round after Watson stunned Rua with a head kick and followed up with strikes until the referee stepped in to save the unconscious Rua.

After Rua lost against Tom Watson, he said he would not continue fighting and would retire.
Rua is now set to come out of retirement to fight a rematch against Pride FC vet and former World Extreme Cage Fighting middleweight champion  Paulo Filho.

The two originally met at Pride Bushido 10 where Paulo Filho won by unanimous decision after three rounds.

Rua once again lost to Filho by yet another controversial referee stoppage by Mario Yamasaki. Filho landed a strong combination which rocked Rua, forcing him to shoot for a single leg take down. Yamasaki saw this as a reason to stop the fight, and stepped in to save Rua.

Personal life
Rua and longtime girlfriend Ana married on October 8, 2004 in Curitiba, Brazil. The couple have two sons, born in August 2008 and March 2010.

Championships and accomplishments

Mixed martial arts
EliteXC
EliteXC Middleweight Championship (One Time, First)

Mixed martial arts record

|-
| Loss
| align=center| 20–13–1
| Paulo Filho
| TKO (punches)
| Best of the Best: Filho vs. Ninja II
| 
| align=center| 1
| align=center| 0:47
| Belem, Brazil
| 
|-
| Loss
| align=center| 20–12–1
| Tom Watson
| KO (head kick and punches)
| BAMMA 6: Watson vs. Rua
| 
| align=center| 3
| align=center| 2:06
| London, England
| 
|-
| Loss
| align=center| 20–11–1
| Roy Boughton
| Decision (unanimous)
| W-1 New Ground
| 
| align=center| 3
| align=center| 5:00
| Nova Scotia, Canada
| 
|-
| Win
| align=center| 
| Jeremy May
| Submission (guillotine choke)
| Impact FC 2
| 
| align=center| 1
| align=center| 4:12
| Sydney, Australia
| 
|-
| Win
| align=center| 19–10–1
| Arturo Arcemendes
| Submission (arm-triangle choke)
| Bitetti Combat MMA 7
| 
| align=center| 1
| align=center| 1:27
| Rio de Janeiro, Brazil
|
|-
| Win
| align=center| 18–10–1
| Jason Jones
| TKO (punches)
| Bitetti Combat MMA 5
| 
| align=center| 2
| align=center| 3:20
| São Paulo, Brazil
|
|-
| Win
| align=center| 17–10–1
| Alex Stiebling
| KO (head kick)
| Bitetti Combat MMA 4
| 
| align=center| 1
| align=center| 0:39
| Rio de Janeiro, Brazil
| 
|-
| Loss
| align=center| 16–10–1
| Riki Fukuda
| Decision (unanimous)
| Dream 8
| 
| align=center| 2
| align=center| 5:00
| Nagoya, Japan
|
|-
| Loss
| align=center| 16–9–1
| Benji Radach
| KO (punches)
| EliteXC: Heat
| 
| align=center| 2
| align=center| 2:31
| Sunrise, Florida, United States
|
|-
| Win
| align=center| 16–8–1
| Tony Bonello
| KO (punches)
| EliteXC: Return of the King
| 
| align=center| 1
| align=center| 3:16
| Hawaii, United States
|
|-
| Win
| align=center| 15–8–1
| Xavier Foupa-Pokam
| Submission (rear-naked choke)
| Cage Rage 24
| 
| align=center| 2
| align=center| 3:47
| London, England
|
|-
| Loss
| align=center| 14–8–1
| Robbie Lawler
| KO (punches)
| EliteXC: Uprising
| 
| align=center| 3
| align=center| 2:04
| Hawaii, United States
| 
|-
| Win
| align=center| 14–7–1
| Joey Villaseñor
| KO (punches)
| Strikeforce: Shamrock vs. Baroni
| 
| align=center| 2
| align=center| 1:05
| California, United States
| 
|-
| Win
| align=center| 13–7–1
| Alex Reid
| TKO (cut on the shin)
| Cage Rage 21
| 
| align=center| 1
| align=center| 0:28
| London, England
|
|-
| Win
| align=center| 12–7–1
| Mark Weir
| Submission (arm-triangle choke)
| Cage Rage 18
| 
| align=center| 2
| align=center| 1:15
| London, England
|
|-
| Loss
| align=center| 11–7–1
| Denis Kang
| KO (punches)
| Pride - Bushido 11
| 
| align=center| 1
| align=center| 0:15
| Saitama, Saitama, Japan
| 
|-
| Loss
| align=center| 11–6–1
| Paulo Filho
| Decision (unanimous)
| Pride - Bushido 10
| 
| align=center| 2
| align=center| 5:00
| Tokyo, Japan
|
|-
| Win
| align=center| 11–5–1
| Murad Chunkaiev
| Submission (heel hook)
| Pride 30
| 
| align=center| 1
| align=center| 3:31
| Saitama, Saitama, Japan
| 
|-
| Loss
| align=center| 10–5–1
| Quinton Jackson
| Decision (split)
| Pride 29
| 
| align=center| 3
| align=center| 5:00
| Saitama, Saitama, Japan
|
|-
| Loss
| align=center| 10–4–1
| Sergei Kharitonov
| KO (punches)
| Pride Total Elimination 2004
| 
| align=center| 1
| align=center| 4:14
| Saitama, Saitama, Japan
| 
|-
| Win
| align=center| 10–3–1
| Alexander Otsuka
| Submission (side choke)
| Pride 27
| 
| align=center| 1
| align=center| 5:25
| Osaka, Japan
|
|-
| Win
| align=center| 9–3–1
| Akira Shoji
| KO (flying knee)
| Pride Shockwave 2003
| 
| align=center| 1
| align=center| 2:24
| Saitama, Saitama, Japan
|
|-
| Loss
| align=center| 8–3–1
| Kevin Randleman
| TKO (cut)
| Pride 24
| 
| align=center| 3
| align=center| 0:20
| Tokyo, Japan
|
|-
| Loss
| align=center| 8–2–1
| Ricardo Arona
| Decision (unanimous)
| Pride 23
| 
| align=center| 3
| align=center| 5:00
| Tokyo, Japan
|
|-
| Win
| align=center| 8–1–1
| Mario Sperry
| Decision (unanimous)
| Pride 20
| 
| align=center| 3
| align=center| 5:00
| Yokohama, Japan
|
|-
| Win
| align=center| 7–1–1
| Alex Andrade
| Decision (unanimous)
| Pride 18
| 
| align=center| 3
| align=center| 5:00
| Fukuoka, Fukuoka, Japan
|
|-
| Loss
| align=center| 6–1–1
| Dan Henderson
| Decision (split)
| Pride 17
| 
| align=center| 3
| align=center| 5:00
| Tokyo, Japan
|
|-
| Win
| align=center| 6–0–1
| Daijiro Matsui
| TKO (soccer kicks and stomps)
| Pride 16
| 
| align=center| 3
| align=center| 0:51
| Osaka, Japan
|
|-
| Win
| align=center| 5–0–1
| Rogerio Sagate
| Submission (keylock)
| Meca World Vale Tudo 5
| 
| align=center| 1
| align=center| 3:54
| Curitiba, Brazil
|
|-
| Draw
| align=center| 4–0–1
| Akihiro Gono
| Draw (majority) 
| Shooto - To The Top 4
| 
| align=center| 3
| align=center| 5:00
| Tokyo, Japan
|
|-
| Win
| align=center| 4–0
| Leopoldo Serao
| TKO (cuts)
| Meca World Vale Tudo 4
| 
| align=center| 1
| align=center| 7:00
| Curitiba, Brazil
|
|-
| Win
| align=center| 3–0
| Luiz Claudio das Dores
| TKO (submission to leg kicks)
| Meca World Vale Tudo 3
| 
| align=center| 1
| align=center| 3:00
| Curitiba, Brazil
|
|-
| Win
| align=center| 2–0
| Israel Albuquerque
| TKO (submission to punches)
| Meca World Vale Tudo 2
| 
| align=center| 1
| align=center| 1:36
| Curitiba, Brazil
|
|-
| Win
| align=center| 1–0
| Adriano Verdelli
| Submission (triangle choke)
| Meca World Vale Tudo 1
| 
| align=center| 1
| align=center| 3:08
| Curitiba, Brazil
|

References

External links

Murilo Rua's ProElite.com Profile
Murilo Rua's EliteXC Profile

1980 births
Living people
Brazilian male mixed martial artists
Heavyweight mixed martial artists
Light heavyweight mixed martial artists
Mixed martial artists utilizing Muay Thai
Mixed martial artists utilizing Brazilian jiu-jitsu
Brazilian practitioners of Brazilian jiu-jitsu
People awarded a black belt in Brazilian jiu-jitsu
Brazilian Muay Thai practitioners
Sportspeople from Curitiba